Kelmentsi is an urban-type settlement in Chernivtsi Oblast (province) in western Ukraine. The town is also the administrative center of the Dnistrovskyi Raion (district), housing the local district administration buildings. It hosts the administration of Kelmentsi settlement hromada, one of the hromadas of Ukraine. Population: 

At the 2001 census, the town's population was 8,007, which consisted mostly of ethnic Ukrainians. Kelmentsi itself is located in close proximity to the border with Moldova.

Until 18 July 2020, Kelmentsi served as an administrative center of Kelmentsi Raion. The raion was abolished in July 2020 as part of the administrative reform of Ukraine, which reduced the number of raions of Chernivtsi Oblast to three. The area of Kelmentsi Raion was merged into Dnistrovskyi Raion.

People from Kelmentsi
  (born 1929), Romanian mathematician, member of the Romanian Academy (since 1992)
 Igor Plotnitsky (born 1964), Ukrainian separatist leader
 Yuriy Tkachuk (born 1995), footballer

References

Urban-type settlements in Dnistrovskyi Raion
Populated places established in 1559
Khotinsky Uyezd
Hotin County
Ținutul Suceava